The Northwest Region is one of ten United States regions that currently send teams to the Little League World Series, the largest youth baseball competition in the world. The region's participation in the LLWS dates back to 1957, when it was known as the West Region.  However, when the LLWS was expanded in 2001 from eight teams (four U.S. teams and four "International" teams from the rest of the world) to 16 teams (eight U.S. and eight International), the Western Region was split into the Northwest and West Regions.

The Northwest Region is made up of four states.

Hawaii was a member of the region from 2002 to 2006. During that time, Wyoming was in the West Region. Colorado was a member in 2001, but has since been put into the Southwest Region.

Following the 2021 LLWS, Montana and Wyoming has been moved to a newly created Mountain Region. The latter region is one of the two new U.S. regions to be created as part of a planned expansion of the LLWS from 16 to 20 teams. This expansion was originally scheduled to occur for 2021, but was delayed to 2022 due to the COVID-19 pandemic.

Regional Championship

The list below lists each state's participant in the Northwest Little League Region Tournament. That year's winner is indicated in green.

2001

2002–2005
In 2002, some Little League regions were realigned. This resulted in Hawaii joining the Northwest Region, Wyoming moving to the West Region, and Colorado becoming part of the Southwest Region.

2006–2021
In 2006, Wyoming returned to compete in the Northwest Region, while Hawaii was moved to the West Region.

2022-present
After the 2021 Little League World Series, Montana and Wyoming left to join the newly formed Mountain Region.

LLWS results
As of the 2022 Little League World Series.

Results by state
As of the 2022 Little League World Series. Italics indicates the state is no longer a member of the Northwest Region.

See also
Little League World Series 1957–2000 (West Region)

References

External links
Official site

North
Sports in the Western United States
Baseball competitions in the United States
2001 establishments in the United States
Recurring sporting events established in 2001